The architecture of Uttar Pradesh demonstrates a diverse and eclectic combination of Buddhist, Hindu, Indo-Islamic, and Indo-European architectural styles. Three of its architectural monuments—the Taj Mahal, the Agra Fort, as well as the township of Fatehpur Sikri founded by the Mughal emperor Akbar—are designated UNESCO World Heritage Sites. The architectural structures in Uttar Pradesh include ancient Buddhist stūpas and vihāras, ancient Buddhist and Hindu monasteries, townships, forts, palaces, temples, mosques, mausoleums, memorials, and other community structures. Uttar Pradesh's architectural structures also include various Hindu temples, Ghats, etc. largely found in ancient cities like Benares (Varanasi), Brindaban (Vrindavan), Mathura, and Prayagraj (Allahabad).

Ancient

Buddhist 
Most of the ancient buildings and structures at Sarnath were damaged or destroyed. However, amongst the ruins can be distinguished:
 The Dhamek Stupa; it is an impressive 128 feet high and 93 feet in diameter.
 The Dharmarajika Stupa is one of the few pre-Ashokan stupas remaining, although only the foundations remain.
 The Ashoka Pillar erected here, originally surmounted by the "Lion Capital of Asoka" (presently on display at the Sarnath Museum), was broken during Turk invasions but the base still stands at the original location.
 The Sarnath Archaeological Museum houses the famous Ashokan lion capital, which miraculously survived its 45-foot drop to the ground (from the top of the Ashokan Pillar), and became the National Emblem of India and national symbol on the Indian flag. The museum also houses a famous and refined Buddha-image of the Buddha in Dharmachakra-posture.

For Buddhists, Sarnath (or Isipatana) is one of four pilgrimage sites designated by Gautama Buddha, the other three being Kushinagar, Bodh Gaya, and Lumina.

Hindu monuments
Famous temples are the Dashavatara Temple in Deograh, Kashi Vishwanath Temple in Varanasi and Krishnajanmabhoomi in Mathura.

Indo-Islamic

Sultanates
Atala Masjid of Jaunpur shows some influences from Hindu architecture.

Mughal

Uttar Pradesh has three World Heritage Sites: Taj Mahal, Agra Fort and the nearby Fatehpur Sikri. Allahabad Fort stands on the banks of the Yamuna near the confluence with the river Ganges. It is the largest fort built by Akbar.

Taj Mahal 
The Taj Mahal in Agra, built between 1632 and 1643 during the reign of Mughal Emperor Shah Jahan is considered to be one of the best examples of Mughal architecture, as well as Indo-Islamic architecture as a whole. While earlier Mughal buildings were primarily constructed of red sandstone, Shah Jahan promoted the use of white marble inlaid with semi-precious stones. Buildings under his patronage reached new levels of refinement. It is surrounded by vast gardens on all four sides.

Oudh
Lucknow, the capital of the state, has several beautiful historical monuments such as Bara Imambara and Chhota Imambara.  It has also preserved the damaged complex of the Oudh-period British Resident's quarters, which are being restored.

British Colonial period

European styles 
The Allahabad Public Library built in the Scottish Baronial style, and All Saints Cathedral, Allahabad and Kanpur Memorial Church built in the gothic revival style are examples of European-styled buildings in Uttar Pradesh.

Indo-Saracenic Architecture 

The Lucknow Charbagh railway station and Kanpur Central railway station were built in the Indo-Saracenic style.

Post-Independence

NOIDA is a planned city and IT hub.

Notable buildings

References

Buildings and structures in Uttar Pradesh
Uttar